Paul Clinton Harris (born March 31, 1964) is a former Delegate of Albemarle County, Virginia, in the Virginia House of Delegates.

He graduated from Hampton University in 1986 with a B.A. in political science. Harris served as a 1st lieutenant in military intelligence from 1986 to 1990. He graduated from George Washington University in 1995 with a J.D.

Political career
He became the first African American Republican elected to the House of Delegates since Reconstruction in the 1997 legislative elections. He won re-election in 1999. In 2001, he began working for the United States Department of Justice.

Virginia Republican party leaders floated Harris as a possible successor to Republican Party Chairman Jeff Frederick in March 2009.

References

Politicians from Charlottesville, Virginia
1964 births
Living people
African-American state legislators in Virginia
African-American United States Army personnel
George Washington University Law School alumni
20th-century American politicians
21st-century American politicians
Hampton University alumni
Virginia Republicans